Grant Cramer (born November 10, 1961) is an American actor and producer who has starred in films and on television. He is the son of actress Terry Moore and Stuart Warren Cramer III, and a great-grandson of engineer and inventor Stuart W. Cramer.

Cramer's first feature film role was in 1980, when he starred in the horror film New Year's Evil. His first big role came in the 1984 cult comedy film Hardbodies, in which he played Scotty Palmer. His other big film was the 1988 cult classic Killer Klowns from Outer Space. Other film roles include appearances in Mach 2 (2001) and Follow the Prophet (2009).

Cramer's first television role was in the 1982 made-for-television movie Desperate Lives as a teen drug user. He starred in the soap opera The Young and the Restless as the psychotic stalker Shawn Garrett from 1985-1986. He later returned to the soap in 1996 to play Adam Hunter, a love interest for Ashley Abbott.

Cramer has made guest appearances on episodes of The Facts of Life, Rags to Riches, and Murder, She Wrote.

Cramer turned his attention to writing, producing and directing, performing all three duties on the short film "Say Goodnight, Michael". The film won numerous awards, including the Grand Jury Award at the New York Independent Film and Video festival.

In 2008, he created and executive produced the VH1 series Old Skool with Terry and Gita, which aired in over 40 countries internationally.

From 2011 through 2013, Cramer was the executive vice president of Envision Entertainment, their chief creative executive on 10 movies during that span.

Cramer is the President of Landafar Entertainment, an independent film finance and production company. Films they have executive produced include Lone Survivor, And So It Goes, November Man and How to Make Love Like an Englishman (2015).

Cramer married his wife, Olga, in 2010. The couple have one child together,  son Preston Cody Sasha Cramer, born on May 22, 2015.

Filmography
 New Year's Evil (1980)
 Hardbodies (1984)
 Killer Klowns from Outer Space (1988)
 Father's Day (1988)
 An Inconvenient Woman (1991)
 Hangfire (1991)
 Hail Caesar (1994)
 Screening (1997)
 Mach 2 (2001)
 Raptor (2001)
 The Still Life (2006)
 The Final Song (2009)
 Follow the Prophet (2009)
 Margarine Wars (2012)
 Beyond (2012)
 Willy's Wonderland (2021)

As producer:
  Freelancers (2012)  ... Production Executive
  Fire with Fire ... Production Executive
  End of Watch (2012) ... Production Executive
  Empire State ... Production Executive
  The Frozen Ground (2013) ... Production Executive
  Escape Plan (2013) ... Production Executive
  2 Guns (2013) ... Production Executive
  Lone Survivor (2013) ... Executive Producer
  And So It Goes (2014) ... Executive Producer
  The November Man (2014) ... Executive Producer
  How to Make Love Like an Englishman (2014) ... Producer, Second Unit Coordinator
 Arctic Dogs (2019) ... Executive Producer
 The War with Grandpa (2020) ...Executive Producer
 Followed (2020) ... Executive Producer
 Willy's Wonderland (2021) Producer, Second Unit Director

Notes

External links

American male film actors
American male soap opera actors
American male television actors
Male actors from Los Angeles
1961 births
Living people